A cartouche (also cartouch) is an oval or oblong design with a slightly convex surface, typically edged with ornamental scrollwork. It is used to hold a painted or low-relief design. Since the early 16th century, the cartouche is a scrolling frame device, derived originally from Italian . Such cartouches are characteristically stretched, pierced and scrolling.

Another cartouche figures prominently in the 16th-century title page of Giorgio Vasari's Lives of the Most Excellent Painters, Sculptors, and Architects, framing a minor vignette with a pierced and scrolling papery cartouche.

The engraved trade card of the London clockmaker Percy Webster shows a vignette of the shop in a scrolling cartouche frame of Rococo design that is composed entirely of scrolling devices.

Gallery

See also 

 Tondo (art): round (circular)
 Medallion (architecture): round or oval
 Architectural sculpture
 Cartouche (cartography)
 Cartouche
 Resist: a technique in ceramics to highlight cartouches, etc.
 Console (heraldry)

Footnotes

External links 

Ornaments
Decorative arts
Architectural elements
Ornaments (architecture)